This is a list of the members of the 22nd Seanad Éireann, the upper house of the Oireachtas (legislature) of Ireland.  These Senators were elected or appointed in 2002, after the 2002 general election and served until the close of poll for the 23rd Seanad at the end of July 2007.

Composition of the 22nd Seanad 
There are a total of 60 seats in the Seanad. 43 Senators are elected by the Vocational panels, 6 elected by the Universities and 11 are nominated by the Taoiseach.

The following table shows the composition by party when the 22nd Seanad first met on 12 September 2002.

Effect of changes 

Notes

 ^ The 2002 column refers to the state of parties when 22nd Seanad first met in 2002
^ The May 2007 column refers to the state of parties immediately prior to the 2007 Dáil election 
^ The July 2007 column refers to the state of parties when the Seanad reassembled after the 2007 Dáil election, when 14 senators were elected to the 30th Dáil, including 4 senators who had been nominated by the Taoiseach, who were replaced by 4 new nominees.

List of senators

Changes
There were no by-elections to the 22nd Seanad.

The first vacancy was caused by the death of Kate Walsh, who had been nominated by the Taoiseach and was replaced by another nominee.

Fourteen senators were elected to the 30th Dáil at the general election on 24 May 2007. Four of these had been nominated by the Taoiseach and were replaced by new nominees, but the seats of then ten elected senators remained vacant until the Seanad was dissolved. (The vacant seats were those of seats of James Bannon, Ulick Burke, Noel Coonan, Timmy Dooley, Frank Feighan, Brian Hayes, Martin Mansergh, Joe McHugh, Eamon Scanlon and Joanna Tuffy).

See also 
Members of the 29th Dáil
Government of the 29th Dáil

References

External links 

 
22